Pachyhalictus bedanus is a species of bee in the genus Pachyhalictus, of the family Halictidae.

External links
 Atlashymenoptera.net
 Scribd.com
 Academia.edu
 Books.google.lk

Halictidae
Insects described in 1926